José Antonio de Lavalle y Pardo was a Peruvian lawyer and politician.

Biography
He was born in Lima on January 1, 1858. His father was the diplomat José Antonio de Lavalle y Arias de Saavedra, who participated in the  before the War of the Pacific. His mother was Mariana Pardo y Lavalle, sister of President Manuel Pardo y Lavalle. On December 16, 1886, he married Rosalía García Delgado with whom he had five children, including José Antonio de Lavalle y García and Juan Bautista de Lavalle y García. He completed his studies in Europe and finished them at the University of San Marcos.

He fought in the War of the Pacific, joining the reserves of the Peruvian Army and later being part of the battle of Miraflores during the defense of Lima.

During the second government of Nicolás de Piérola, he was appointed Minister of Justice, Instruction and Worship between November 1897 and March 1998, forming part of the cabinets of José Antonio de Lavalle y García and Juan Bautista de Lavalle y García.

In 1907 he was elected deputy for the province of Moyobamba. He served in office during the first governments of José Pardo y Barreda and Augusto B. Leguía. In addition to this, he was Minister of Justice and prosecutor of the Supreme Court.

He died in Lima on February 9, 1918.

References

1858 births
1918 deaths
People from Lima
Peruvian lawyers
Peruvian Ministers of Justice
Pardo family
Lavalle family